Hamsageethe (The Swan song) is a 1975 Indian feature film in the Kannada language. It was directed by G. V. Iyer, based on a novel by T. R. Subba Rao  with Anant Nag and Rekha Rao in lead roles.

The film won 2 National Film Awards; the National Film Award for Kannada film and National Award for Best Male Playback singer (M. Balamuralikrishna) at the 23rd National Film Awards.

Hamsa Geethe, the novel by Ta Ra Su was made into a Hindi film, Basant Bahar in 1956. The novel is supposedly based on the real-life story of the 18th-century Carnatic musician Bhairavi Venkatasubbaiah.

Cast
 Anant Nag as  Bhairavi Venkatasubbiah 
 M. V. Narayana Rao
 Rekha Rao
 G. S. Rama Rao
 B. V. Karanth
 Mysore Mutt
 Vasudev Girimaji
 G. V. Iyer
RS Krishnaswamy as Tipu Sultan

Awards 
 23rd National Film Awards
 Best Feature Film in Kannada
 Best Male Playback singer - M. Balamuralikrishna
 Karnataka State Film Awards 1975-76
 Second Best Film
 Best Music Director -  M. Balamuralikrishna, B. V. Karanth
 Best Cinematographer - Nemai Ghosh
This film screened at 11th IFFI for 50 years of playback singing.

Notes

External links
 

1970s Kannada-language films
1975 films
Kannada literature
Best Kannada Feature Film National Film Award winners
Films based on Indian novels
Films directed by G. V. Iyer
Films scored by M. Balamuralikrishna